Charles McKiernan may refer to:
 Joe Beef (1835–1889), Montreal tavern owner
 Charles Henry McKiernan (1825–1892), Santa Cruz settler